The 1991 Punjab Killings was a killings of train passengers that occurred on 15 June 1991 in the Ludhiana district of the Indian State of Punjab, where Khalistani militants killed at least 80 to 100 Hindu passengers travelling in two trains.

Events

June 1991
The militants stopped the two trains about a kilometre from Ludhiana station by pulling the emergency cords, triggering emergency brakes. They proceeded to open fire inside the trains at around 9:35 p.m. (IST), killing at least 80 passengers. After the attackers fled, the train moved back to Badduwal station, where the rescue team arrived with doctors. Local villagers helped the survivors with food, water, medicine, and mental support. The attacks came less than five hours after polling closed in a national election already marred by violence and interrupted by the assassination of ex-Prime Minister Rajiv Gandhi around a month prior.

December 1991
Four men, believed to have been Khalistani, boarded a local passenger train travelling from Ludhiana to Ferozepur at Ludhiana. They pulled the emergency cord about 7:30 in the evening near a village called Sohian. Six other armed militants climbed aboard the train at the Sohian crossing. The militants shot at passengers who appeared to be Hindu using AK-47s. All but two of the 49 victims were Hindus. After the massacre, the gunmen left the train and disappeared into the night.

References

External links

See also 
 1987 Punjab killings
 List of Victims of Terrorism in Indian Punjab

Mass murder in 1991
Terrorist incidents in India in 1991
Insurgency in Punjab
Massacres in India
Ludhiana district
Terrorism in Punjab, India
Terrorist incidents on railway systems in Asia
June 1991 events in Asia